The 2014–15 Umaglesi Liga was the 26th season of top-tier football in Georgia. The season began on 9 August 2014 and ended on 27 May 2015.

Teams

Stadiums and locations

Kit manufacturer and sponsor

League table

Results

Relegation play-offs
A match was played between the 14th placed (Metalurgi Rustavi) team in the 2014–15 Umaglesi Liga and the promotion play-off winner (Lokomotivi Tbilisi) from the 2014–15 Pirveli Liga. The winner earned a place in the 2015–16 Umaglesi Liga.

Top goalscorers

See also
 2014–15 Pirveli Liga
 2014–15 Georgian Cup

References

External links
  

Erovnuli Liga seasons
1
Georgia